Keethavari gudem is one of the villages located in Garidepally mandal in Suryapet district  of Telangana in India. It is well developed village with having all the facilities like supermarket,Petrol bunk, Bank etc..

References

Villages in Nalgonda district